"The Window" may refer to:

 The Window (song cycle), an 1871 song cycle by Arthur Sullivan and Alfred, Lord Tennyson
 The Window (1949 film), a 1949 American film
 The Window (1970 film), a 1970 Iranian film
 The Window ((Steve Lacy album), a 1988 album by saxophonist Steve Lacy
 "The Window" (How I Met Your Mother), a 2009 episode of the American sitcom How I Met Your Mother
 The Window (Cécile McLorin Salvant album), 2018
 "The Window", by The Flying Lizards from their self-titled album

Places
 The Window (Colorado), a rock saddle on Rio Grande Pyramid in the San Juan Mountains of Colorado, United States.

See also
 Window (disambiguation)